Nalgonda is a city and municipality in the Indian state of Telangana. It is the headquarters of the Nalgonda district, as well as the headquarters of the Nalgonda mandal in the Nalgonda revenue division.

Etymology 
In the past, Nalgonda was referred to as Nilagiri. During the medieval Bahamani kingdom, it was renamed Nalgunda.  The name was changed to "Nalgonda" for official uses during the rule of the later Nizam kings.

History

Paleolithic Age 
There is archaeological evidence that Paleolithic people lived in the area that is now Nalgonda, fashioning tools and weapons out of stone.  Some of these implements have been found in the Nalgonda area, similar to those discovered at the Sloan archaeological site in Arkansas.

Neolithic Age 
Traces of Neolithic culture were found at Chota Yelupu, where sling stones and other contemporary objects were excavated.  Evidence of Megalithic culture was also found via the discovery of innumerable burials at various places around Nalgonda.

The Mauryas and Satavahanas (230 BC – 218 BC) 
The political history of the Nalgonda district commences with the Mauryas.  During the reign of Ashoka the Great, the Mauryas maintained control over the Nalgonda region.  Later, the Satavahanas, who ruled between 230 BC and 218 BC, took control of the area.

During this period, the region established trade contacts with the Roman Empire.

Ikshvakus (227 AD – 306 AD) 
In 227 AD, the Ikshvaku dynasty took control of the region.  During this period, members of various Saka tribes migrated to the area. Buddhism flourished during this time.

Invasion of Samudragupta 
After the Ikshvakus, the Pallavas and Yadavas fought for supremacy over the region.  However, after Samudragupta (c. 335 AD – c. 375 AD) invaded and conquered most of India, the area fell under the control of his Gupta Empire.  The Empire fell in the 6th century.

The Chalukyas and Rashtrakutas 
Starting in the 6th century, the Chalukya dynasty ruled the modern-day Nalgonda region, as well as much of southern and central India.  A major portion of the Nalgonda area appears to have passed from the Chalukyas of Badami to the Rashtrakutas.  However, the Rashtrakutas fell in 973, and power shifted to the Chalukyas of Kalyani.  The Chalukyas continued to rule the area until the end of the 12th century.

Medieval period 
During the medieval era, the Kakatiya dynasty took control of the region from the western Chalukyas.  During the reign of Prataparudra II, in 1323, the kingdom was annexed to the Tughluq Empire.

When Muhammad bin Tughluq ruled (around 1324–1351), Musunuri chief Kapayanayaka ceded a part of Nalgonda to Ala-ud-din Hasan Bahman Shah of the Bahmani Sultanate.  He annexed the region to the Bahmani Kingdom.

In 1455, Jalal Khan he declared himself king at Nalgonda, but this was short-lived.  He was quickly defeated and the region brought back to the Bahmani Kingdom.

During the time of the Bahmani Sultan Shihabud-din Mahmun, Sultan Quli was appointed as tarafdar of the Telangana region (now the state of Telangana).  Quli's son, Jamshid, took control of the region from his father.  Later, Qutub Shahis took control of the region, and maintained it until 1687.

Modern period: Mughals and Asaf Jahis 
Nizam-ul-Mulk (Asaf Jah I) defeated Mubasiz Khan at Shaker Khere in Berar and ruled the Deccan autonomously.  This district, like the other districts of Telangana, was controlled by Asaf Jahis, and remained under their rule for nearly two hundred and twenty-five years.

Geography 

Climate

Demographics
 census of India, Nalgonda had a population of 135,744; of which 67,971 are male and 67,773 are female. An average of 86.83% city population were literate; where 92.91% of them were male and 80.78% were female literates.

Governance 
The municipality of Nalgonda was categorized as a "Grade-III municipality" when it was first created in 1941.  It is now a "Special Grade Municipality."

Transport 

The city is connected to major cities and towns by means of road and railways. National and state highways that pass through the city are National Highway 565, State highway 2 and 18.

Road 
TSRTC operates buses from Nalgonda to various destinations in Telangana state.

Railway 
Nalgonda railway station provides rail connectivity to the city. It is classified as a B–category station in Guntur railway division of the South Central Railway zone and is located on the Pagidipalli-Nallapadu section of the division.

Attractions 

Nalgonda contains several religious sites, including Maruthi Mandir and Kolanupaka Temple, a Jain shrine.  Other attractions include the Nagarjuna Sagar Dam, a Gowthama Buddha Museum, and the Bhuvanangiri Fort, built by Tribhuvanamalla Vikramaditya VI, panagallu someswara temple and many masjid built by Alamgir in and around the district.

Education 
As district headquarters, Nalgonda serves as a hub for primary and secondary education for surrounding villages. Nalgonda has many primary and upper primary schools, offering instruction in Telugu, Urdu, and English.

The district contains one university, Mahatma Gandhi University. It also contains a number of colleges specializing in engineering, medicine, pharmacy, and sciences, as well as vocational colleges. 

There are also many state government-operated schools and colleges in the city, such as Nagarjuna Government Degree college.

See also 
 Nalgonda (Assembly constituency)

References

External links 

 Nalgonda Municipality

Cities and towns in Nalgonda district
Municipalities of Telangana
District headquarters of Telangana
Cities in Telangana